The 2001 Barcelona Dragons season was the ninth season for the franchise in the NFL Europe League (NFLEL). The team was led by head coach Jack Bicknell in his ninth year, and played its home games at Estadi Olímpic de Montjuïc in Barcelona, Catalonia, Spain. They finished the regular season in first place with a record of eight wins and two losses. In World Bowl IX, Barcelona lost to the Berlin Thunder 24–17.

Offseason

Free agent draft

Personnel

Staff

Roster

Schedule

Standings

Game summaries

Week 1: at Berlin Thunder

World Bowl IX

Notes

References

Barcelona
Barcelona Dragons seasons